The Ministry of Finance (FM) is one of the 12 ministries which comprise the Finnish Government. The FM prepares the Government's economic and financial policy as well as the state budget, and acts as a tax policy expert. The ministry indirectly employs about 12,000 people through its administrative branch. About 360 people are employed by the ministry itself.

The FM is headed by Finland's Minister of Finance, Annika Saarikko, holding the office since 27 May 2021. The ministry's most senior public official is Permanent Secretary Martti Hetemäki.

For 2018, the FM's budget is €17,194,849,000.

History 
Along with the Ministry of Justice, the FM is one of the two oldest ministries in Finland. Finland’s fiscal autonomy started in the Diet of Porvoo in 1809, when the Emperor of Russia and Grand Duke of Finland Alexander I solemnly declared that all taxes levied in autonomous Grand Duchy of Finland would be used solely to meet the nation’s own needs. The predecessor of Ministry of Finance was called the Economic Division of The Governing Council. It was founded to manage the civil administrative and economic affairs of the country.

References

External links

 
Government of Finland
Finance
Finland